The Indonesian Nahdlatul Community Party is a minor conservative political party in Indonesia.

It was originally established on 16 August 1998 as the Nahdatul Ummat Party (Partai Nahdatul Ummat) and took part in the 1999 legislative election, winning 5 seats in the People's Representative Council. However, Law No. 31/2002 on Political Parties stated that parties failing to win at least 3 percent of the vote were not eligible to participate in the next election. Therefore, the party changed its name and on 5 March 2003 the Indonesian Nahdlatul Community Party was officially founded.

In the 2004 legislative election, the party won 0.8% of the popular vote and lost all 5 seats. After initially failing to qualify, following a lawsuit the party won the right to contest the 2009 elections, in which it won only 0.14 percent of the vote, lower from the electoral threshold of at least 2,5%, again without any seats of the People's Representative Council.

References

2003 establishments in Indonesia
Conservatism in Indonesia
Conservative parties in Asia
Islamic democratic political parties
Islamic political parties in Indonesia
Islamism in Indonesia
Political parties established in 2003
Political parties in Indonesia
Pancasila political parties